The 2023 Mississippi Valley State Delta Devils baseball team is a baseball team that represents the Mississippi Valley State University in the 2023 NCAA Division I baseball season. The Delta Devils are members of the Southwestern Athletic Conference and play their home games at Magnolia Field in Itta Bena, Mississippi. They were led by first-year head coach Milton Barney Jr..

Previous season
The Delta Devils finished the 2022 NCAA Division I baseball season 10–31–1 overall (4–25 conference) and sixth place in the west division of the conference standings, failing to qualify for the 2022 Southwestern Athletic Conference Baseball Tournament.

Preseason
On June 15, 2022, head coach Stanley Stubbs resigned due to health concerns. On August 11, 2022, Milton Barney Jr. was named the head coach of the Delta Devils.

Preseason SWAC poll
For the 2023 poll, Mississippi Valley State was projected to finish in sixth in the East Division.

Roster

Schedule

! style="" | Regular Season
|- valign="top"

|- align="center" bgcolor="#ccffcc"
| 1 || February 17 || || vs  || Minute Maid Park • Houston, Texas || 7–5 || Stallings (1–0) || Zwitzer (0–1) || Salazar-Ortega (1) || – || 1–0 || –
|- align="center" bgcolor="#ffcccc"
| 2 || February 18 || || vs  || Minute Maid Park • Houston, Texas || 1–14 || Womble (1–0) || Lewis (0–1) || None || – || 1–1 || –
|- align="center" bgcolor="#ffcccc"
| 3 || February 19 || || vs  || Minute Maid Park • Houston, Texas || 4–14 || Rudy (1–0) || McClendon (0–1) || None || 300 || 1–2 || –
|- align="center" bgcolor="#ffcccc"
| 4 || February 22 || || at  || FedExPark • Memphis, Tennessee || 10–19 || Ross (1–0) || Lewis (0–2) || None || 319 || 1–3 || –
|- align="center" bgcolor="#ccffcc"
| 5 || February 25 || ||  || Magnolia Field • Itta Bena, Mississippi || 12–5 || McClendon (1–1) || Little (0–2) || None || – || 2–3 || –
|- align="center" bgcolor="#ffcccc"
| 6 || February 25 || || Arkansas–Pine Bluff || Magnolia Field • Itta Bena, Mississippi || 8–11 || Greene (1–1) || Valenzuela (0–1) || None || – || 2–4 || –
|- align="center" bgcolor="#ccffcc"
| 7 || February 26 || || Arkansas–Pine Bluff || Magnolia Field • Itta Bena, Mississippi || 16–3 || Stallings (2–0) || Little (0–2) || None || – || 3–4 || –
|- align="center" bgcolor="#ffcccc"
| 8 || February 28 || || at  || Tomlinson Stadium–Kell Field • Jonesboro, Arkansas || 0–12 || Carmack (1–0) || Snipes (0–1) || None || 254 || 3–5 || –
|- align="center" bgcolor="#ffcccc"
| 9 || March 1 || || at Arkansas State || Tomlinson Stadium–Kell Field • Jonesboro, Arkansas || 2–3 || Armstrong (1–0) || Lewis (0–3) || Wiseman (1) || 254 || 3–6 || –
|-

|- align="center" bgcolor="#ccffcc"
| 10 || March 4 || ||  || Magnolia Field • Itta Bena, Mississippi || 15–5 || Sigmon (1–0) || Thomas (0–3) || None || – || 4–6 || –
|- align="center" bgcolor="#ccffcc"
| 11 || March 4 || || Tougaloo || Magnolia Field • Itta Bena, Mississippi || 7–0 || Valenzuela (1–1) || Carter (1–1) || None || – || 5–6 || –
|- align="center" bgcolor="#ccffcc"
| 12 || March 7 || || at  || Foster Baseball Field at McGowan Stadium • Lorman, Mississippi || 8–4 || Stallings (3–0) || Braziel (0–3) || Salazar-Ortega (2) || – || 6–6 || –
|- align="center" bgcolor="#cccccc"
| – || March 8 || ||  || Magnolia Field • Itta Bena, Mississippi ||colspan=7| Game cancelled
|- align="center" bgcolor="#ffcccc"
| 13 || March 10 || || at New Orleans || Maestri Field at Privateer Park • New Orleans, Louisiana || 3–7 || LeBlanc (2–1) || Sigmon (1–1) || Usey (2) || 322 || 6–7 || –
|- align="center" bgcolor="#ffcccc"
| 14 || March 11 || || at New Orleans || Maestri Field at Privateer Park • New Orleans, Louisiana || 3–35 || Mitchell (3–1) || Valenzuela (1–2) || Macip (1) || 388 || 6–8 || –
|- align="center" bgcolor="#ffcccc"
| 15 || March 12 || || at New Orleans || Maestri Field at Privateer Park • New Orleans, Louisiana || 3–16 || Horton (2–1) || Lewis (0–4) || None || 396 || 6–9 || –
|- align="center" bgcolor="#ffcccc"
| 16 || March 14 || || at McNeese || Joe Miller Ballpark • Lake Charles, Louisiana || 2–7 || Morrow (2–0) || Valenzuela (1–3) || None || 958 || 6–10 || –
|- align="center" bgcolor="#ffcccc"
| 17 || March 18 || ||  || Magnolia Field • Itta Bena, Mississippi || 0–8 || Viets (1–0) || Sigmon (1–2) || None || – || 6–11 || 0–1
|- align="center" bgcolor="#ffcccc"
| 18 || March 18 || || Florida A&M || Magnolia Field • Itta Bena, Mississippi || 2–18 || Granger (1–1) || McClendon (1–2) || None || – || 6–12 || 0–2
|- align="center" bgcolor="#ffcccc"
| 19 || March 19 || || Florida A&M || Magnolia Field • Itta Bena, Mississippi || 6–11 || Simmons (1–2) || Stallings''' (3–1) || None'' || – || 6–13 || 0–3
|- align="center" bgcolor=
| 20 || March 21 || || Alcorn State || Magnolia Field • Itta Bena, Mississippi || – || – || – || – || – || – || –
|- align="center" bgcolor=
| 21 || March 22 || || at  || Ben Meyer Diamond at Ray E. Didier Field • Thibodaux, Louisiana || – || – || – || – || – || – || –
|- align="center" bgcolor=
| 22 || March 24 || || at  || Jackie Robinson Ballpark • Daytona Beach, Florida || – || – || – || – || – || – || –
|- align="center" bgcolor=
| 23 || March 25 || || at Bethune–Cookman || Jackie Robinson Ballpark • Daytona Beach, Florida || – || – || – || – || – || – || –
|- align="center" bgcolor=
| 24 || March 26 || || at Bethune–Cookman || Jackie Robinson Ballpark • Daytona Beach, Florida || – || – || – || – || – || – || –
|- align="center" bgcolor=
| 25 || March 29 || || at Southeastern Louisiana || Pat Kenelly Diamond at Alumni Field • Hammond, Louisiana || – || – || – || – || – || – || –
|- align="center" bgcolor=
| 26 || March 31 || || Jackson State || Magnolia Field • Itta Bena, Mississippi || – || – || – || – || – || – || –
|-

|- align="center" bgcolor=
| 27 || April 1 || || Jackson State || Magnolia Field • Itta Bena, Mississippi || – || – || – || – || – || – || –
|- align="center" bgcolor=
| 28 || April 2 || || Jackson State || Magnolia Field • Itta Bena, Mississippi || – || – || – || – || – || – || –
|- align="center" bgcolor=
| 29 || April 4 || || vs Alcorn || Smith–Wills Stadium • Jackson, Mississippi || – || – || – || – || – || – || –
|- align="center" bgcolor=
| 30 || April 6 || || at  || Wheeler–Watkins Baseball Complex • Montgomery, Alabama || – || – || – || – || – || – || –
|- align="center" bgcolor=
| 31 || April 7 || || at Alabama State || Wheeler–Watkins Baseball Complex • Montgomery, Alabama || – || – || – || – || – || – || –
|- align="center" bgcolor=
| 32 || April 8 || || at Alabama State || Wheeler–Watkins Baseball Complex • Montgomery, Alabama || – || – || – || – || – || – || –
|- align="center" bgcolor=
| 33 || April 11 || || at Grambling State || Wilbert Ellis Field at Ralph Waldo Emerson Jones Park • Grambling, Louisiana || – || – || – || – || – || – || –
|- align="center" bgcolor=
| 34 || April 14 || || Bethune–Cookman || Magnolia Field • Itta Bena, Mississippi || – || – || – || – || – || – || –
|- align="center" bgcolor=
| 35 || April 15 || || Bethune–Cookman || Magnolia Field • Itta Bena, Mississippi || – || – || – || – || – || – || –
|- align="center" bgcolor=
| 36 || April 16 || || Bethune–Cookman || Magnolia Field • Itta Bena, Mississippi || – || – || – || – || – || – || –
|- align="center" bgcolor=
| 37 || April 18 || || at Nichols || Ben Meyer Diamond at Ray E. Didier Field • Thibodaux, Louisiana || – || – || – || – || – || – || –
|- align="center" bgcolor=
| 38 || April 21 || || at Florida A&M || Moore–Kittles Field • Tallahassee, Florida || – || – || – || – || – || – || –
|- align="center" bgcolor=
| 39 || April 22 || || at Florida A&M || Moore–Kittles Field • Tallahassee, Florida || – || – || – || – || – || – || –
|- align="center" bgcolor=
| 40 || April 23 || || at Florida A&M || Moore–Kittles Field • Tallahassee, Florida || – || – || – || – || – || – || –
|- align="center" bgcolor=
| 41 || April 25 || || Grambling State || Magnolia Field • Itta Bena, Mississippi || – || – || – || – || – || – || –
|- align="center" bgcolor=
| 42 || April 28 || ||  ||  Magnolia Field • Itta Bena, Mississippi || – || – || – || – || – || – || –
|- align="center" bgcolor=
| 43 || April 29 || || Alabama A&M || Magnolia Field • Itta Bena, Mississippi || – || – || – || – || – || – || –
|- align="center" bgcolor=
| 44 || April 30 || || Alabama A&M || Magnolia Field • Itta Bena, Mississippi || – || – || – || – || – || – || –
|-

|- align="center" bgcolor=
| 45 || May 5 || || Alabama State || Magnolia Field • Itta Bena, Mississippi || – || – || – || – || – || – || –
|- align="center" bgcolor=
| 46 || May 6 || || Alabama State || Magnolia Field • Itta Bena, Mississippi || – || – || – || – || – || – || –
|- align="center" bgcolor=
| 47 || May 7 || || Alabama State || Magnolia Field • Itta Bena, Mississippi || – || – || – || – || – || – || –
|- align="center" bgcolor=
| 48 || May 12 || || at Jackson State || Braddy Field • Jackson, Mississippi || – || – || – || – || – || – || –
|- align="center" bgcolor=
| 49 || May 13 || || at Jackson State || Braddy Field • Jackson, Mississippi || – || – || – || – || – || – || –
|- align="center" bgcolor=
| 50 || May 14 || || at Jackson State || Braddy Field • Jackson, Mississippi || – || – || – || – || – || – || –
|- align="center" bgcolor=
| 51 || May 18 || || at Alabama A&M || Bulldog Field • Huntsville, Alabama || – || – || – || – || – || – || –
|- align="center" bgcolor=
| 52 || May 19 || || at Alabama A&M || Bulldog Field • Huntsville, Alabama || – || – || – || – || – || – || –
|- align="center" bgcolor=
| 53 || May 20 || || at Alabama A&M || Bulldog Field • Huntsville, Alabama || – || – || – || – || – || – || –
|}
</div></div>
|}

References

Mississippi Valley State
Mississippi Valley State Delta Devils baseball seasons
Mississippi Valley State